Härlanda Church Ruins are the remains of a medieval church in Gothenburg, Sweden.

History
The  church was built in the first part of the 12th century and torn down in 1528 by request from King Gustav I of Sweden to build Lödöse which became an important trade city and which would serve as  the precursor of Gothenburg which was founded in 1621. The ruin were excavated  by Gothenburg Museum curator Carl Ramsell af Ugglas (1884-1946) and restored at the expense of the City of Gothenburg  in 1925.

See also
History of Gothenburg

References

Related reading
Carl Ramsell af Ugglas (1931)  Lödöse: (gamla Lödöse) : historia och arkeologi. Skrifter utgivna till Göteborgs stads trehundraårsjubileum genom jubileumsutställningens publikationskommitté (Göteborg: Medéns bokh)

External links
Göteborgs stadsmuseum  website

Ruins in Sweden
Church ruins in Sweden 
History of Gothenburg